Fatsani: A Tale of Survival is a 2020 Malawian drama film directed by Gift Sukez Sukali. It follows the life of a young girl Fatsani who is forced to sell bananas in the streets after her school is closed due to sanitation issues. It was selected as the Malawian entry for the Best International Feature Film at the 94th Academy Awards.

Cast
 Kelvin Maxwell Ngoma as Lipenga
 Edwin Chonde as Mr. Mussa
 Hannah Sukali as Fatsani
 Patrick Mhango as Mr. Pilato Chipwanya

See also
 List of submissions to the 94th Academy Awards for Best International Feature Film
 List of Malawian submissions for the Academy Award for Best International Feature Film

References

External links
 
Variety.com Fatsani movie review 
Fatsani  Movie Gets Mixed Ratings

2020 films
2020 drama films
Malawian drama films
2020s English-language films